Phillipe Richard Bourque (born June 8, 1962) is an  American former professional ice hockey player. He was never selected in the NHL Entry Draft; instead, he was signed as a free agent by the Pittsburgh Penguins on October 4, 1982. He is a distant cousin to Hall of Fame defenseman Raymond Bourque.

Playing career
Bourque joined the Penguins organization after playing two seasons in the Ontario Hockey League with the Kingston Canadians.  He joined the Penguins' American Hockey League affiliate, the Baltimore Skipjacks for the 1982–83 season, and made his NHL debut with Pittsburgh in 1983–84, playing in five games.

Bourque would not become a mainstay on the Penguins roster until the 1988–89 season, during which he played in all 80 of the team's games.  He would be a member of the Penguins teams which won the Stanley Cup in the 1990–91 and 1991–92 seasons.  Mike "Doc" Emrick  would recount later that Bourque, after winning the 1991-1992 Stanley Cup, had put his name inside the Cup with the many jewelers who had worked on the cup in the past.  He had worked on the cup in his garage using a screwdriver to repair a loose screw at the top of the trophy. He would leave the Penguins after the 1992 Cup victory, and play sparingly with the New York Rangers and Ottawa Senators.  Just prior to the 1994–95 NHL lockout, Bourque was nearly killed when he took a 40-foot fall down a cliff near Arizona's Lake Powell.  He suffered three broken vertebrae in his neck, a broken skull, a shattered sinus cavity, a broken cheekbone and a broken nose in the incident.

Bourque left the NHL after the 1995–96 season.  He played with the IHL's Chicago Wolves for one season, and then spent three seasons playing in Germany before retiring following the 1999–2000 season.

Bourque currently works as the color commentator alongside Mike Lange for Penguins radio broadcasts. Bourque is lovingly known by Penguins faithful as the Ol' Two-Niner, his Penguins jersey number. Bourque's final segment of the Penguins pre-game broadcasts is known as "Two Minutes with the Ol' Two-Niner." in which Bourque interviews a player, coach, or personality relevant to the upcoming game.

Bourque earned a spot in the hearts of many Penguins fans when he remarked at the victory celebration of Pittsburgh's first Stanley Cup title in 1991 by saying "What do you say we take this thing out on the river and party all summer"! He was referring to taking the Stanley Cup with him on any number of outdoor activities offered by Pittsburgh's three main rivers.

In his NHL career, Bourque appeared in 477 games.  He scored 88 goals and added 111 assists.  He also appeared in 56 playoff games, scoring 13 goals and recording 12 assists.

He also represented the United States at the 1994 Men's World Ice Hockey Championships.

In October 2019, Bourque released his book "If These Walls Could Talk: Pittsburgh Penguins," where he shares his stories from both his playing and broadcasting careers with the Penguins organization.

Career statistics

References

External links
 
http://www.eliteprospects.com/player.php?player=74334

1962 births
American men's ice hockey defensemen
Baltimore Skipjacks players
Chicago Wolves (IHL) players
Detroit Vipers players
Hamburg Crocodiles players
Kingston Canadians players
Living people
Muskegon Lumberjacks players
National Hockey League broadcasters
New York Rangers players
Ottawa Senators players
People from Chelmsford, Massachusetts
Pittsburgh Penguins announcers
Pittsburgh Penguins players
Sportspeople from Middlesex County, Massachusetts
Stanley Cup champions
Starbulls Rosenheim players
Undrafted National Hockey League players
Ice hockey people from Massachusetts
Chelmsford High School alumni
Ice hockey players from Massachusetts